The NFL Top 100 Players of 2018 was the eighth season in the series. It ended with reigning NFL MVP Tom Brady being ranked #1, making him the only player to be voted #1 three times, already being the only player to be voted first more than once. For the second time in the list's history, the Super Bowl MVP (Nick Foles) failed to rank.

Episode list

The list

References

National Football League trophies and awards
National Football League records and achievements
National Football League lists